Horse Heaven may refer to:

 Horse Heaven, Oregon, a ghost town in Jefferson County, Oregon, US
 Horse Heaven, Washington, an unincorporated community in Benton County, Washington State, US
 Horse Heaven (conservation area), a conservation area in western Virginia, US
 Horse Heaven Hills, a range of hills in Klickitat, Yakima, and Benton counties in Washington State, US

See also
 Horse Haven, California